The St. Joseph and Savannah Interurban Railway was a 13-mile interurban electric railway that ran between St. Joseph, Missouri and Savannah, Missouri from 1910 to 1939.

It was operated by the St. Joseph Railway, Light, Heat and Power Company, which operated the trolley system in St. Joseph.  It began, on July 5, 1910, to compete with the Chicago Great Western Railroad. It consisted of three wooden cars and headed north on the streetcar line down St. Joseph Avenue and terminated four blocks west of the square in Savannah.

The line connected to the Kansas City, Clay County and St. Joseph Railway.

See also
List of interurbans

External links
Interurbanroad.com history

Kansas City interurban railways
Buchanan County, Missouri
Andrew County, Missouri
Defunct Missouri railroads